Le Grand Union Elementary School District is a public school district in Merced County, California, United States.

References

External links
 

School districts in Merced County, California